Manor Motorsport Ltd, currently trading as Manor Endurance Racing Ltd is a British motor racing company that was formed in 1990 by former single-seater champion John Booth. Manor has participated as a team in many motorsport disciplines since its inception, including Formula One.

Its current sole involvement in motor racing is an entry to compete in the FIA World Endurance Championship since 2016.

The Formula One team most recently known as Manor Racing cut its links with Manor Motorsport following John Booth and his partner Graeme Lowdon's resignation from the Formula One project at the end of the 2015 season.

Historical overview

Throughout its history, the team primarily competed in Formula Renault, with past drivers including 2007 Formula One World Champion Kimi Räikkönen, 7 times Formula One World Champion Lewis Hamilton and other Formula One drivers such as Antônio Pizzonia. In 1994 James Matthews set a record 11 race wins in a season that lasted more than 20 years, on his way to winning both the British and European series for Manor.

They entered Formula Three in 1999, winning successive British titles with Marc Hynes and Pizzonia.

In 2007, Manor Motorsport saw a change of ownership when Formula Renault UK team manager, Tony Shaw, bought out John Booth and continued operating under the name of Manor Competition from a completely separate base. In turn, John Booth retained the Manor Motorsport name and continued to race in the Formula 3 Euro Series until 2009.

From 2010 to 2015, Manor Motorsport participated in the Formula One World Championship under many guises.

Manor also had a GP3 Series team from 2010 until 2014, run under the name of "Marussia Manor Racing" with the exception of the 2010 season.

On 5 February 2016, Manor Motorsport announced its entry into the 2016 FIA World Endurance Championship.

Partnership with MP Motorsport

From 2012 until 2015, Manor Competition competed in the Formula Renault 2.0 Northern European Cup and Eurocup Formula Renault 2.0 championships in partnership with MP Motorsport. As well as this, the two teams combined forces in Auto GP in 2012 and 2013.

World Endurance Championship
For its participation in the 2016 FIA World Endurance Championship, Manor are using two Oreca 05 chassis powered by Nissan engines, racing in the LMP2 class. The No. 44 car – driven by Tor Graves, James Jakes and Will Stevens – was entered for the full season. The No. 45 car was entered on a one-off basis for every race except for Le Mans, as the car was entered too late to gain entry. Richard Bradley, Roberto Merhi and Matt Rao were signed to drive the car.

Formula One

Virgin Racing (2010–11)

On 12 June 2009, it was announced Manor's application to participate in the 2010 Formula One season had been accepted. Their Formula One team was registered as Manor Grand Prix although it raced as Virgin Racing for sponsorship reasons. Powered by Cosworth engine, the team distinguished itself for designing its cars only digitally. This design approach was abandoned in 2011 when the team forged a technical partnership with McLaren.

Marussia F1/Manor Marussia (2012–15)

The Formula One team was renamed the Marussia F1 Team after Marussia Motors bought a controlling interest in the team. At the following race, the inaugural , Marussia fielded only one car out of respect for Bianchi but also as a result of mounting financial pressure, which then saw the team enter administration alongside its rival, Caterham. Marussia would take no further part in the 2014 season. It risked losing its 2014 prize money unless able to further compete in the sport the following year.

On 19 February 2015, Manor Motorsport's administrators announced that the team had come out of administration and planned to enter the 2015 Formula One season under the name Manor Marussia F1 Team with John Booth and Graeme Lowdon continuing to run the team. This was possible thanks to businessman Stephen Fitzpatrick buying the team, with Justin King joining as chairman.

Booth and Lowdon left the Formula One team at the end of the 2015 season. The team continued to race for one more season, under the name of Manor Racing, albeit independently of Manor Motorsport.

Driver accidents

Two of the Manor team's drivers have sustained fatal head injuries. In July 2012, test driver María de Villota crashed heavily into a team transporter during straight line aerodynamic tests. Among other things, she suffered the loss of her right eye but recovered sufficiently to become a motorsport safety advocate and get married. In October 2013, however, she died following a heart attack believed to have been caused by her underlying brain injuries.

He succumbed to his injuries in July 2015 after remaining hospitalised and in a coma since the accident. Bianchi had made a significant contribution to the team as recognised by team principal, John Booth who, immediately following the 2015 Australian Grand Prix, attributed the team's 2015 return after failing to complete the prior season to the point-scoring and prize-winning performance of Bianchi at the 2014 Monaco Grand Prix. In Bianchi's honour, from the 2014 Russian Grand Prix until the end of their F1 participation, the team cars carried a "JB17" logo, which represent Bianchi's initials and race number.

Results

Formula One

F3 Euroseries

GP3 Series

In detail 
(key) (Races in bold indicate pole position) (Races in italics indicate fastest lap)

World Endurance Championship

24 Hours of Le Mans results

Timeline

Notes

References

External links

British auto racing teams
British Formula Renault teams
Auto racing teams established in 1990
1990 establishments in the United Kingdom
Companies based in South Yorkshire
GP3 Series teams
Formula Renault Eurocup teams
Formula 3 Euro Series teams
British Formula Three teams
Auto GP teams
FIA World Endurance Championship teams
24 Hours of Le Mans teams